The 1984–85 season was the 74th season in Hajduk Split’s history and their 39th in the Yugoslav First League. Their 5th place finish in the 1983–84 season meant it was their 39th successive season playing in the Yugoslav First League.

Competitions

Overall

Yugoslav First League

Classification

Results summary

Results by round

Matches

Yugoslav First League 

Sources: hajduk.hr

Yugoslav Cup 

Sources: hajduk.hr

Cup Winners' Cup 

Source: hajduk.hr

Player seasonal records

Top scorers 

Source: Competitive matches

See also 
 1984–85 Yugoslav First League
 1984–85 Yugoslav Cup

References

External sources 
 1984–85 Yugoslav First League at rsssf.com
 1984–85 Yugoslav Cup at rsssf.com
 1984–85 European Cup Winners' Cup at rsssf.com

HNK Hajduk Split seasons
Hajduk Split